Grindelia inuloides is a North American species of flowering plants in the family Asteraceae. It is widespread across much of Mexico, from Nuevo León to Oaxaca.

References

inuloides
Plants described in 1807
Flora of Mexico